"Sick and Tired" is a song written by Chris Kenner and bandleader Dave Bartholomew. Originally recorded by Kenner in 1957, it was covered and made into a hit by Fats Domino in 1958.

Cover versions
Ronnie Hawkins & The Hawks (1960, 1979)
Merseybeat band The Searchers (1963)
Danish band Sir Henry and his Butlers (1964)
Australian band Billy Thorpe and the Aztecs (1964)
I New Dada (1966)
The Grateful Dead on Rare Cuts and Oddities 1966
Hank Squires (1966)
Waylon Jennings (1970)
 Johnny Jenkins on Ton-Ton Macoute! (1970)
 Tom Fogerty on Excalibur (1972)
Jerry Lee Lewis (1974) and with Jon Brion on Rock & Roll Time (2014)
Johnny Winter (1976)
Delbert McClinton (1978)
Ronnie Earl and the Broadcasters (1983)
Frankie Ford (1984)
Lyres (1988)
 Danko/Fjeld/Andersen (1991)
Denmark-based Scots pianist Stan Urban (1994)
 Bo Diddley (1994)
Alex Chilton (1995)
 Sleepy LaBeef  (1996)
Boz Scaggs (1997)
 Roland Stone (1997)
Andy Lee Lang (1998)
 Jack Calmes and The Forever Fabulous Chickenhawks (1999)
 Cyril Neville (2000)
 Jimmy Cavallo with Ron Spencer & Jumpstart (2002)
Mike Sanchez (2008)

References

1957 songs
Fats Domino songs
Tom Fogerty songs